XXI World Rhythmic Gymnastics Championships were held in Berlin, the capital of Germany, October 23–26, 1997

Medal winners

Participants
The following countries sent competitor(s) Argentina, Armenia, Australia, Austria, Azerbaijan, Belgium, Belarus, Brazil, Bulgaria, Canada, China, Croatia, Cuba, Cyprus, Czech Republic, Estonia, Finland, France,  Georgia, Germany, Greece, Hungary, Israel, Italy, Japan, Kazakhstan, Kyrgyzstan, Latvia, Lithuania, Malaysia, Mexico, The Netherlands, New Zealand, Norway, Poland, Portugal, Romania, Russia, Slovakia, Slovenia, South Africa, South Korea, Spain, Thailand, Turkey, Ukraine, The United Kingdom, USA, Uzbekistan and Yugoslavia

Individual
 Lorena Garroco, Roxana Marion, Sandra Re, Anahi Sosa
 Nina Aloian, Narine Davoyan, Lusine Galstyan, Karine Kachatrian
 Shaneez Johnston, Danielle Le Ray, Leigh Marning, Kristy Darrah
 Alexandra Baer, Valerie Hackl, Birgit Schilien
 Alfia Kukshinova, Alieva Nourdjachan, Irina Pavlichenco, Sabina Tagiev
 Tatiana Ogrizko, Evgenia Pavlina, Yulia Raskina, Valeria Vatkina
 Astrid de Mul, Frederique Donnay, Cecile Maissin
 Kizzy Antualpa, Dayane Camillo da Silva, Camila Ferezin, Elise Penedo
 Teodora Alexandrova, Borinna Guineva, Viktoria Danova
 Julia Lombara, Jodie Miller, Erika Leigh Stirton
 Yunfei Pu, Xi Zhang, Bei Wu, Xiaojing Zhou
 Kristina Bajaz, Petra Jurinec, Zrinka Uzbinec, Tanja Balazic
 Yamile Sotolongo, Yordina Corrales, Yasleidy Rodriguez
 Lucie Barkova, Renata Hostinska, Kamila Krynicka, Andrea Sebestova
 Angela Georgiou, Maria Kyprianidou, Chrtalla Panayiotou, Elena Theodorou
 Natalja Kornysheva, Ege Soidla, Irina Stadnik, Julia Tsvetajeva
 Heini Lautala, Heidi Niemi, Minna Markkanen, Laura Pietilainen
 Eva Serrano, Stephanie Delayat, Caroline Stepanoff, Amelie Villeneuve
 Magdalena Brzeska, Edita Schaufler, Monique Strobl, Helene Asmus
 Sophia Bakola, Maria Pagalou, Irene Polydorou, Georgia Straka
 Viktoria Frater, Orsolya Balogh, Dora Toth, Katalin Kiss
 Lital Baumwell, Svetlana Tokayev, Ania Shabsis, Dana Sulema
 Susanna Marchesi, Martina Nadalini, Arianna Rusca, Laura Zacchilli 
 Mikako Iwamoto, Rieko Matsunaga, Kayako Miyazaki, Yukari Murata
 Elena Rogojina, Yulia Yourtchenko, Valeria Khairoulina
 Saule Tlebaldinova
 Lioubov Hohloya, Darya Medyouho, Ina Proyouma, Ana Zelenska
 Anzelika Filipovic, Kristina Kliukevichute, Natalija Filistovic, Živilė Rezgytė 
 Carolyn Au Yong, Farah Zellinah Kemal, Sarina Sundarajah, Chee Kiat Thye
 Silvia Palacios, Marcela Salinas, Laura Escalante, Karenia Gutierrez
 Sabina Hoogendijk, Lucinda Schuurman, Ramona Stook
 Felicity Gould-Thorpe, Gemma Railton, Simone Clark
 Marianne Haugli, Siri Kjeksrud
 Krystyna Leskiewicz, Joanna Bobrucka, Agnieszka Brandebura, Anna Kwitniewska
 Ines Honorio, Susana Nascimento, Vanessa Pereira, Joana Raposo
 Evelina Benchea, Dilana Ferencz, Dana Carteleanu, Alina Stoica
 Yana Batyrshina, Natalia Lipkovskaya, Amina Zaripova
 Zuzana Dobiasova, Eva Filcova, Eleonora Korcekova, Ivana Morolikova
 Anja Cucek, Dusica Jeremic, Ana Rebov, Nina Vengust
 Andrea Schermoly, Michelle Cameron, Brigitte Heeb, Cheryl Phillips
 Hwang Sook-Hyun, Kim Eun-Hae, Kim Min-Jung, Kwon Bo-Young
 Almudena Cid, Alba Caride-Costas, Esther Dominguez, Carolina Malchair
 Aunchaya Yeansukon
 Misra Gigeroglu
 Tamara Erofeeva, Elena Vitrichenko, Tatiana Popova
 Debbie McLarnon, Annabel Brown, Laura Mackie, Melanie Willmott
 Alicia Albe, Tara McCargo, Meaghan Muller
 Lilya Nasirova, Tanya Budarina, Elena Mesheryakova, Irina Zamyatina
 Iva Zimonjic

Individual All-Around

Individual Rope

Individual Hoop

Individual Clubs

Individual Ribbon

Team All-Around Final

References
 

Rhythmic Gymnastics World Championships
International gymnastics competitions hosted by Germany
1997 in gymnastics
1997 in German sport